Scopula protecta is a moth of the  family Geometridae. It is found on Madagascar.

References

Moths described in 1956
protecta
Moths of Madagascar